Popstars is an Irish reality television series, broadcast and produced by RTÉ One, which ran from 2001 to 2002. The programme is based on the original New Zealand series and is part of the international Popstars franchise. The series follows members of the public auditioning to be part of a new band, with the age limit being 18 years old.

The judging panel included band manager and television personality Louis Walsh, singer-songwriter Linda Martin and music executive Bill Hughes. The programme was broadcast on a weekly basis; starting on 15 November 2001 and ending on 17 February 2002. Following the conclusion of the series, Walsh became a judge on the second incarnation of the UK counterpart, titled Popstars: The Rivals.

Production
Following the success of Popstars: New Zealand, producers of the show decided to launch the show as an international franchise, with an Irish edition ordered in earlier 2001. Jonathan Dowling later signed on as creator and showrunner of the show, under the working title, Popstars: Ireland, which was later changed to Irish Popstars, before being changed once again to simply Popstars. Dowling decided to sign Boyzone manager and television personality Louis Walsh, worldwide singing superstar Linda Martin and international music executive Bill Hughes to be seated as the judges on the programme.

With producers planning to have the series to be aired during the summer of 2001, however the series did not premiere until 15 November, broadcasting during the 2001–02 television season, with 13 weekly episodes ordered. The first season concluded on 17 February 2002, with the series' band being named Six, with Sinéad Sheppard, Emma O'Driscoll, Kyle Anderson, Sarah Keating, Andy Orr and Liam McKenna being elected as the band members.

The series is infamous for then-16-year old Nadine Coyle's appearance on the show; she was initially inducted into the band after the auditions, but was later asked to leave the show as it emerged she had lied about being 18 in order to participate; she was then replaced by Keating, who originally did not make it into the band.

In mid-2002, it was announced that the show had been cancelled after just one season and would be replaced by new singing competition, You're a Star. Walsh meanwhile became a judge on the second incarnation of the UK series, titled Popstars: The Rivals, which aimed to create a girl group and a boyband who would compete for that year's Christmas number one spot on the UK Singles Chart. With Walsh's encouragement, Coyle reauditioned for the show and was voted by the public into the girl group Girls Aloud, managed by Walsh, eventually winning the competition with their song "Sound of the Underground".

Episodes
The series contained 13 episodes. RTE released a 2-hour "feature length movie" compilation version of the series on VHS in 2002. It was never reissued or rebroadcast in Ireland, however the series was broadcast on ITV in the UK during the Saturday morning children's television programme, SMTV Live.

References

External links
 

2001 Irish television seasons
2002 Irish television seasons
Irish television series based on non-Irish television series
RTÉ original programming
2001 Irish television series debuts
2002 Irish television series endings